Ruslan Serhiyovych Chernenko (born 29 September 1992) is a Ukrainian professional footballer currently playing as a midfielder.

Career
Chernenko is a product of different Kievan youth football school systems (Arsenal, Dynamo, Olympic College). He played for Dynamo and Arsenal. At the age of 15 he moved to Arsenal football school, where he was training until 2009.
In January 2022 Chernenko joined Bulgarian Second League team Marek Dupnitsa, on loan from Ahrobiznes Volochysk. On 6 June 2022 he moved to the newly promoted to First League team Spartak Varna, signing a 2-years long contract.

Honours

Club

Desna Chernihiv
 Ukrainian Second League: 2012–13

Arsenal Kyiv
 Ukrainian First League: 2017–18

Individual
 Ukrainian First League top scorer: 2020-21

References

External links
 Ruslan Chernenko at FC Ahrobiznes Volochysk 
 
 
 
 

1992 births
Living people
Footballers from Kyiv
Ukrainian footballers
FC Arsenal Kyiv players
RVUFK Kyiv players
SC Chaika Petropavlivska Borshchahivka players
FC Desna Chernihiv players
FC Ahrobiznes Volochysk players
PFC Marek Dupnitsa players
PFC Spartak Varna players
Ukrainian Premier League players
Ukrainian First League players
Ukrainian Second League players
First Professional Football League (Bulgaria) players
Second Professional Football League (Bulgaria) players
Association football midfielders
Ukrainian expatriate footballers
Expatriate footballers in Bulgaria
Ukrainian expatriate sportspeople in Bulgaria